The Crown Prince Cup was one of four competitions in the Kuwaiti 2007/2008 season, and all 14 clubs participated in this championship.

First round

|}

 The Away goal rule is not used in this competition, so both teams played again on a neutral stadium. After a 2–2 draw in the playoff match Kazma won 5–4 on penalties.

Quarterfinal

Al Kuwait & Al Arabi received BYE's to this round.

|}

 The Away goal rule is not used in this competition, so both teams played again on a neutral stadium.

Playoff matches: 
Tadamon 2-1 Al Jahra
Al Kuwait 0-0(5-4 on PK) Kazma

Semifinals

|}

Third place play-off

All times given as local time (UTC+3)

Final

External links
 Kuwaiti Crown Prince Cup

2008
Kuwait Crown Prince Cup, 2008
2007–08 domestic association football cups